is a railway station on the West Japan Railway Company Osaka Loop Line in Naniwa-ku, Osaka, Japan. There is a transfer to the Nankai Electric Railway Shiombashi Line at Ashiharachō Station.
The station opened on April 1, 1966.

Layout
There are two side platforms with two tracks elevated.

History 
Station numbering was introduced in March 2018 with Ashiharabashi being assigned station number JR-O17.

Adjacent stations

References

Railway stations in Japan opened in 1966
Osaka Loop Line
Railway stations in Osaka Prefecture